Kadiatou or Kadiatu is a female given name. It may refer to:

People
Given name
Kadiatou Camara (born 1981), Malian sprinter 
Kadiatou Diourthe (born 1994), Malian footballer
Kadiatou Doumbia (born 1994), Malian footballer
Kadiatou Kanouté (born 1978), Malian women's basketball player
Kadiatou Konaté, Malian film director and screenwriter.
Kadiatou Holm Keita, (born 2001), Swedish singer known by the mononym Kadiatou.
Kadiatou Touré (born 1983), Malian women's basketball player

Middle name
Sy Kadiatou Sow (born 1955), Malian politician and minister

See also
Kadiatu Sesay or Kadi Sesay (born 1949), Sierra Leonean politician, feminist, pro-democracy advocate and the vice presidential candidate
Kadiatu Lethbridge-Stewart, a fictional character from the Virgin New Adventures range of spin-offs based on the BBC science fiction television series Doctor Who